The Border-Walwa Football Netball Club is an Australian rules football and netball club founded in 1960 in Walwa, Victoria. Its teams compete in the Upper Murray Football Netball League.

History 
Based in Walwa, heart of the scenic Upper Murray, in North East Victoria, the Border Walwa Football Netball Club is a proud, grassroots Football and Netball Club. The club has been kicking footballs for over 119 years.

Walwa FC (1898-1960) "Tigers"

In 1898 the Walwa Football Club was based in Walwa, Victoria, playing their home games from the Walwa Recreation Reserve. The club competed in the Upper Murray Football League from 1898 to 1960, with the only exception being while the league was in recess (1916-1917, & 1941-1944). Walwa won 15 senior premierships & also were 11 time runners-up competing in 26 grand finals during that time.

Border United FC (1950-1960) "Hoppers"

In 1950 the Border United Football Club was based in Jingellic, New South Wales, playing their home games from the Jingellic Cricket Ground. The club competed in the Upper Murray Football League from 1950 to 1960. Border United never won a senior premiership, however they were 1957 Grand Final runners-up, losing to Walwa, 9.13 (67) to 4.6 (30).

Border-Walwa FNC (1960-present) "Magpies"

In 1960 the Border-Walwa Football Club was based in Walwa, Victoria, playing their home games from the Walwa Recreation Reserve. The club competed in the Upper Murray Football League from 1961. Border-Walwa has won 7 senior premierships & also were 11 time runners-up competing in 18 grand finals during that time.

Combined the Walwa FC, the Border United FC, & the Border-Walwa FNC have won a total of 22 senior premierships, but the Border-Walwa FNC only has 7 senior premierships officially recognised by the Upper Murray Football Netball League. This is similar to how combined the Fitzroy FC, the Brisbane Bears, & the Brisbane Lions have won a total of 11 VFL/AFL premierships, but the Brisbane Lions only has 3 VFL/AFL premierships officially recognised by the Australian Football League.

2000 and beyond
On Saturday 23 May 2015, the Border-Walwa senior football team broke its 47-match losing streak after beating Corryong by 35 points at Corryong. As reported by The Border Mail that night:

At the club's annual general meeting on Sunday the 9th of February (2020) the Border Mail reported that Border-Walwa Football Netball Club's had decide to enter recess for the 2020 season. A number of factors were cited including population decline, but mainly the devastation of the Upper Murray from the 2019/2020 Australian Bushfires. They hope to re-join the league in 2021.

See also
Australian rules football in Victoria
Australian rules football in New South Wales

References

External links
 Gameday website
 Club profile on AFL National

Australian rules football clubs in Victoria (Australia)
Netball teams in Victoria (Australia)
Multi-sport clubs in Australia